Biały Ług  is a village in the administrative district of Gmina Prażmów, within Piaseczno County, Masovian Voivodeship, in east-central Poland. It lies approximately 4 kilometres (2 mi) south of Policzna, 9 km (6 mi) north-east of Zwoleń, and 35  km (62 mi) south-east of Warsaw.

References

Villages in Piaseczno County